SS Vyner Brooke was a Scottish-built steamship that was both the royal yacht of Sarawak and a merchant ship frequently used between Singapore and Kuching. She was named after the 3rd Rajah of Sarawak, Sir Charles Vyner Brooke. At the outbreak of war with Japan the ship was requisitioned by the Royal Navy, armed, and sunk in 1942.

Description
Ship designed by naval architect F.G Ritchie OBE, of Ritchie & Bisset, Singapore. Ramage & Ferguson of Leith, Edinburgh's harbour area, built the ship, completing her in February 1928. The launch by Her Highness the Ranee was scheduled for 10 November 1927 at Leith. The ship sailed from Leith for Singapore on 17 April 1928.

The main deck was as clear as possible of structures for deck passenger use with accommodations forward for crew and aft for stewards, clerks and ship's boys. The refrigeration plant, designed to keep the cold store two degrees below freezing, was located on the main deck. A staircase at the after end of the saloon led to a shade deck and two de luxe cabins and a private sitting room. The ship was equipped with wireless and carried lifeboats, rafts and lifebelts for 650 people and could carry at least 200 deck passengers.

These fed steam at 180 lbf/in2 to a three-cylinder triple expansion steam engine built by Ramage and Ferguson. The engine was rated at 297 NHP and drove twin screws.

Cargo was handled by two three ton cranes at each hatch with a heavy, twenty ton derrick.

Royal Navy Requisition
At the beginning of the war in the Pacific Vyner Brooke was requisitioned by the Royal Navy, painted gray and armed with a four-inch deck gun forward, two Lewis guns aft and depth charges. The ship's Australian and British officers were mostly Malay Royal Navy Volunteer Reserve and had been asked to remain aboard the now HMS Vyner Brooke. The ship's company, under the command of her peacetime captain, Richard E. Borton, was augmented by reservists, some survivors of HMS Prince of Wales and HMS Repulse and European and Malay professional sailors.

Sinking and massacre

On 14 February 1942 in World War II, while evacuating nurses and wounded servicemen away from Singapore she was bombed by Japanese aircraft and sunk. Some of the survivors who reached Bangka Island east of Sumatra in the Dutch East Indies were massacred by the Imperial Japanese Army. Others were imprisoned in Palembang and Muntok POW camps.

References

Further reading

1927 ships
Maritime incidents in February 1942
Royal and presidential yachts
Sarawak
Ships built in Leith
Ships sunk by Japanese aircraft
Steamships
World War II shipwrecks in the Java Sea